Katie Kratz Stine (born December 6, 1956) was a Republican member of the Kentucky Senate representing Campbell and Pendleton Counties as State Senator from the 24th Senate District from 1999 until 2015. She served as the President Pro tempore of the Kentucky State Senate.

Personal life
Stine lives in Southgate, Kentucky and is married to former Campbell Circuit Judge Fred A. Stine, who retired in 2017. They have two children, Caroline and Fritz. She graduated from the University of Cincinnati with a degree in Biology and from Northern Kentucky University's Salmon P. Chase College of Law.

State Representative
Stine served two terms in the Kentucky House of Representatives from 1995 to 1999. In 1994, she announced that she would challenge incumbent William "Bill" Donnermeyer. However, Donnermeyer announced that he would retire at the end of his term. Then Bellevue, Kentucky Mayor Tom Wiethorn, announced as the Democratic nominee for the seat. In November 1994, Stine won the election with 61% of the general election vote.

State Senator
In 1998, Stine announced that she would not run for re-election to the state House and would instead seek election to the Kentucky State Senate. State Senator Gex "Jay" Williams, the incumbent, chose not to run for reelection to the State Senate to run for the U.S. House of Representatives.

In her 1998 election to the State Senate, Stine defeated George Merritt with 72% of the general election vote.

In 1999, Stine was sworn in as a Kentucky State Senator. She was unchallenged in her re-election in 2002 and 2006. In 2010, she won re-election against Democrat Julie Smith Morrow with 69% of the vote.

Committee assignments
Session Committees
Committee on Committees
Economic Development, Tourism & Labor
Enrollment
Health & Welfare
Judiciary - Vice Chair
Natural Resources and Energy
Rules
Veterans, Military Affairs, & Public Protection

Interim Committees
Economic Development and Tourism
Energy Special Subcommittee
Health and Welfare
Judiciary; Labor and Industry
Natural Resources & Environment
Veterans, Military Affairs, and Public Protection

Statutory Committees
Legislative Research Commission
Medicaid Oversight and Advisory Committee - Co-Chair
Program Review and Investigations Comm.

President Pro tempore of the Senate
In 2005, Stine was elected by the State Senate Republican Caucus to be the Senate President Pro tempore. She was the first woman to serve in that role. She succeeded her fellow Northern Kentuckian, State Senator Richard "Dick" Roeding of Lakeside Park, Kentucky.

External links
Kentucky Legislative Research Commission
Senator Katie Kratz Stine official page of the Kentucky Legislature
Senator Katie Kratz Stine official campaign website

References

1956 births
Kentucky lawyers
Republican Party Kentucky state senators
Living people
Republican Party members of the Kentucky House of Representatives
People from Campbell County, Kentucky
University of Cincinnati alumni
Northern Kentucky University alumni
20th-century American politicians
21st-century American politicians
20th-century American women politicians
21st-century American women politicians